"Killer" is a song by the British DJ and record producer Adamski. It was written by Adamski and the British singer-songwriter Seal, who also provided vocals.

"Killer" reached number one on the UK Singles Chart and spent four weeks at the top in May and June 1990. The single sold over 400,000 copies in the UK, earning it gold certification. It also reached number one in Belgium and Zimbabwe and number two in the Netherlands and West Germany. Its music video was directed by Don Searll. Melody Maker ranked "Killer" the ninth-best single of the year.

In 1991, Seal re-recorded "Killer" for his debut album, Seal, produced by Trevor Horn. Seal's version reached number eight in the UK and number 100 on the US Billboard Hot 100.

Background
Adamski recounted that Seal saw him perform in 1989 at an illegal rave at the Santa Pod Raceway. Seal afterwards handed a demo tape to Adamski's MC, Daddy Chester, with which both were impressed. Seal had previously been singing in blues bands but a year spent travelling in Asia had changed his view of life and he had since become involved in the rave scene.

Adamski and Seal later happened to meet on New Year's Eve 1989 at a club named Solaris in London, and Seal was invited to work on one of a number of pieces that Adamski was performing at that time. Adamski had an instrumental track he called "The Killer" because he felt that it sounded 'like the soundtrack to a movie murder scene'. According to Adamski, Seal's vocals were recorded against this track on 27 January 1990: coincidentally the same day that 10,000 people gathered in Trafalgar Square (not far from the studio where they were working) for the 'Freedom to Party' demonstration against a government crackdown on rave culture, which Adamski himself attended. 

Musically, the song is characterized by a distinctive opening bassline and keyboard melody during the chorus. The track makes use of only two instruments – Ensoniq SQ80 Synthesizer and a Roland TR-909 drum machine – and occupied only eight tracks of a 48-track mixing console.

Release
Both Adamski and Seal recalled that they were in financial trouble at the time of recording. Seal was almost penniless and was living in a squat. Although Adamski had his own following as a DJ and was enjoying success with his previous single "N-R-G", he was on a government scheme which paid his rent and allowed him £40 a week. Both Adamski and Seal were struck by the popularity of "Killer" following its release on 21 March 1990. The song went to the top of the UK charts, reached the top ten in many European countries, and sold strongly across the world. Adamski recounted his surprise at people singing the memorable bassline to him in the street and, in particular, at hearing the track played at a wedding in a hotel at which he stayed following a performance in Cambridge. Seal recalled, "within a week, I went from being a relative nobody – this weird guy at raves, with silver bits in my hair – to a household name."

Lyrics
Seal explained that the words he provided for "Killer" were intended as an exhortation to freedom and overcoming; that "the lyrics are about transcending whatever holds you back". The song's line "Racism in amongst future kids can only lead to no good, besides, all our sons and daughters already know how that feels" was re-used in Seal's 1991 song "Future Love Paradise". The introduction to the Seal version also contains the line "It's the loneliness that's the killer", which does not occur in the Adamski version.

Chart performance
"Killer" debuted within the UK Singles Chart top 40 at number 39 on 14 April 1990. Although the track was credited solely to Adamski by the Official Charts Company, various publications credited Seal's contribution to the song as a featured artist. It reached the top 10 during its fourth week on the chart before reaching number one on 12 May. After a four-week run at the top, the track fell one place to number two, being replaced in pole position by "World in Motion" by England New Order. It spent 16 weeks in the top 40.

Critical reception
Upon the release, Bill Coleman from Billboard found that this "enchanting techno-hip-house charmer from the keyboardist's Liveandirect project sports a languid vocal to complement the instrumentation." Dave Jennings from Melody Maker wrote, "This is much like it. "Killer" isn't the brutish thin its title suggests. It's a medium-paced dance track built around a rock-solid bassline, laced with eerie synthetics and topped with the plaintive voice of guest singer Seal — who sounds firmly in the grip of lovely desolution. "Killer" shifts more than enough to fit on the dancefloor, but it might also suit your mood is you have to go home alone when the club has closed. Emotive and effective." David Giles from Music Week called it a "strange release", adding, "It sounds as though a bluesy soul vocalist has become trapped inside a throbbing piece of machinery; it actually takes a fair while to warm up into the familiar pace of house rhythm." He also stated that "Adamski seems to be plotting a move towards the soul world but is still overawed by technology." 

Ian McCann from NME declared it as "a perfect pop moment, if Adamski never makes another record half as good it will stand as a testament to its time like Bowie's, Numan's and Human League's best." Tom Doyle from Smash Hits remarked that the song is "a bit of surprise", complimenting Seal, "who turns in a fine soul-singing". He explained that the song "builds up from a slow Depeche Mode-sounding beginning into a full-blown "rave" record and then drops down for the moody bit again at the end. A complete success."

Retrospective response
In an retrospective review, John Bush from AllMusic stated that the songs like "Killer" "still have an inkling of the freshness they must have possessed back in 1989". In 2010, Tom Ewing of Freaky Trigger commented, "What was startling about the record in 1990 – and what lets it keep its charge now – is that the music simply refuses to get out of Seal’s way. In fact, if you only knew Seal from the rolling smoothness of his latterday career “Killer” would come as a real shock: here he is, making his debut not as a highfalutin’ loverman but as an isolated paranoid battling through a tangle of wires and buzz. Adamski is truly as much the star here, putting together a tense, crisp piece of house music which doesn’t actually need his singer to be memorable (though surely needed him to reach number one)" 

In 2020, The Guardian ranked "Killer" number 87 in their list of "The 100 greatest UK No. 1s". They added, "Every part of Adamski’s production is perfectly designed: the sad chords, the funkily interrupted alien transmission of the synths, the prodding bassline with its edges almost imperceptibly corroded by acid. Most beautiful of all is Seal: half activist, half oracle." In December 1990, Melody Maker ranked it number nine in their list of "Singles of the Year", saying, "A superlative fusion single in a year in which the word "fusion" was glibly overused. "Killer" was 1990's postscript to Marvin Gaye's "What's Goin' On?" Adamski's low-key techno-dub proved the perfect backdrop for Seal's mournful vocals."

Music video
The accompanying music video for "Killer" was directed by Don Searll.

Track listings

Charts and certifications

Weekly charts

Year-end charts

Certifications

Seal version

In 1991, Seal rerecorded "Killer" for his debut album, Seal, produced by Trevor Horn. Seal's version reached number eight in the United Kingdom, number 100 on the US Billboard Hot 100, and number nine on the US Billboard Hot Dance Club Play chart with a remix by William Orbit.

The music video for Seal's version was produced and directed by Don Searll, and used computer-generated science-fiction themed imagery, largely built around a partial re-creation of the M. C. Escher print Another World. The song won British Video of the Year at the 1992 Brit Awards.

A new single release of "Killer", containing new remixes of both this and another Seal hit, "Crazy", was released in January 2005. This brought the single back to the Billboard Hot Dance Club Play chart, where it reached number one.

Track listings

 US maxi-single 
 "Killer" 
 "Killer" 
 "Whirlpool" 
 "Killer" 
 "Come See What Love Has Done" 
 "Hey Joe" 
 "Killer" 

 US maxi-single 
 "Killer" 
 "Killer" 
 "Killer" 
 "Killer" 
 "Killer" 
 "Crazy" 
 "Crazy"

Charts

George Michael version

In 1991, British singer-songwriter George Michael performed "Killer" live at the Wembley Arena in a version that was released on the 1993 EP Five Live. "Papa Was a Rollin' Stone" was also recorded and released on the same album. The two songs were blended together in the live performance, then remixed several times. The P.M. Dawn extended and radio remix for the "Killer"/"Papa" combination was released in 1993. Michael shot a video for the release, in which he did not appear personally. The video was directed by Marcus Nispel.

Track listing
 "Killer/Papa Was a Rollin' Stone" 
 "Killer/Papa Was a Rollin' Stone" 
 "Killer/Papa Was a Rollin' Stone"

Charts

ATB version

German DJ ATB recorded a version of "Killer" in 1999, released as a single on 31 May 1999 in Germany and on 19 September 2000 in the United States. Featuring vocals by Drue Williams, it was the producer's first fully vocal-based song under the ATB name. The song uses elements from both Adamski and Seal's versions, updated with more contemporary production techniques. The UK radio edit differs from others in that it includes ATB's signature guitar sound. This version of "Killer" peaked at number four on the UK Singles Chart and number 36 on the Billboard Hot Dance Club Play chart.

The song featured on the acclaimed 2000 mix album CreamLive.

Track listings

 "Killer" 
"Killer"  - 4:08
"Killer"  - 4:01
"Killer"  - 5:56
"Killer"  - 6:15

 "Killer" 
"Killer"  - 3:25
"Killer"  - 4:00
"Killer"  - 5:52
"Killer"  - 6:50
"Killer"  - 7:45
"Killer"  - 7:11
"Killer"  - 4:06

 "Killer" CD 1 
"Killer"  - 3:28
"Killer"  - 7:48
"Killer"  - 8:25

 "Killer" CD 2 
"Killer"  - 5:55
"Killer"  - 6:52
"Killer"  - 7:11

 "Killer" 
"Killer"  - 4:02
"Killer"  - 7:16
"Killer"  - 7:49
"Killer"  - 8:29
"Killer"  - 5:27
"Killer"  - 7:45
"Killer"  - 8:57
"Killer"  - 3:20

 "Killer 2000" 
"Killer 2000"  - 3:26
"Killer 2000"  - 5:51
"Killer 2000"  - 7:45
"Killer 2000"  - 8:23
"Killer 2000"  - 6:50
"Killer 2000"  - 7:11

Charts

Year-end charts

Usage in media
"Killer" was featured in the 1991 Only Fools and Horses Christmas special, Miami Twice. It has also been used in video games DJ Hero 2 (as a remix by Tiësto) and Forza Horizon 3 (on the in-game radio station "Bass Arena"). A short fragment of the song was played in the first scene of the first episode of Bancroft. It was also used in a May 2018 episode of ITV soap opera Emmerdale, playing on the radio in Charity Dingle's car, and triggering memories of when she was raped at age 14 by Detective Inspector Mark Bails in 1990. Most recently, it has been used by BT in a 2018 advertising campaign.

The music video for the George Michael version of the song appeared in an episode of Beavis and Butthead, called "The Trial".

Other versions
"Killer" has been recorded and performed by numerous other artists over the years:
The power metal band Angel Dust include a version of the song on their 2002 album Of Human Bondage.
It featured as a B-side to the 2003 Sugababes single "Shape".
Scottish garage rock band Sons and Daughters recorded "Killer" as a B-side to their 2007 single "Gilt Complex".
Northern Kings recorded a cover for inclusion on their 2008 album Rethroned.
A version by Nina Hagen features on her 2011 album Volksbeat.
UK alternative rock band 2:54 used the song as a B-side to their 2012 vinyl single "Sugar".
British pop rock band Bastille recorded an electronic heavy cover of "Killer" in 2013 on their second mixtape Other People's Heartache Part 2.
German electronic producer Boys Noize recorded a cover of "Killer" in 2018 with vocalist Steven A. Clark which they released as a single.
Ex-Reuben frontman Jamie Lenman covered the song for his 2019 album Shuffle.
Swedish singer/songwriter Jonas Capring released his cover version in 2019.
In 1995, Polish electronic collective Millennium recorded a cover of "Killer" in 1995 with lyrics sang in Polish. Song was released with their debut album A teraz Polska (Now Poland).

See also
 List of number-one dance singles of 2005 (U.S.)

References

1990 singles
1991 singles
1993 singles
1999 singles
2005 singles
2007 singles
Adamski songs
Seal (musician) songs
George Michael songs
ATB songs
Number-one singles in Zimbabwe
UK Singles Chart number-one singles
Songs written by Seal (musician)
Songs against racism and xenophobia
Song recordings produced by Trevor Horn
Song recordings produced by George Michael
1990 songs
Parlophone singles
RCA Records singles
Hollywood Records singles
MCA Records singles
Kontor Records singles
Warner Records singles
Music videos directed by Marcus Nispel